Das tapfere Schneiderlein is an East German fantasy film directed by Helmut Spieß. It was released in 1956.

Cast
 Kurt Schmidtchen as Das tapfere Schneiderlein
 Christel Bodenstein as Traute
 Horst Drinda as Prinz Eitel
 Fred Kronström as König Griesgram
 Gerd Michael Henneberg as Schatzmeister Gier
 Fred Wolff as Leibdiener Zimperlich
 Fred Mahr as Gärtner Sommer
 Wolf Kaiser as 1. Riese
 Gerhard Frei as 2. Riese
 Ellen Plessow as Schneidermeisterin
 Fredy Barten as Schneidermeister
 Helene Riechers as Musfrau
 Christian Balhaus as Knappe Thilo
 Waltraud Kramm as Junge Bäuerin

External links
 

1956 films
1950s children's fantasy films
German children's fantasy films
East German films
1950s German-language films
Films based on Grimms' Fairy Tales
Films based on fairy tales
1950s German films